Kaleemullah Khan (born 20 September 1992) is a Pakistani footballer who plays in the Iraqi Premier League for Zakho FC and the Pakistan national team. Khan plays as a midfielder or forward, and has been deployed in a variety of attacking roles – as an  attacking midfielder, second striker, centre forward and on either wing. He is the first Pakistani player ever to play and score in United States and also the first Pakistan-born player ever to play against an English Premier League team (Sunderland AFC). He also holds the record of being the first Pakistani player ever to score 100 career goals in club competitions. He has been praised for his positioning, teamwork and stamina, and has shown consistency in scoring and creating goals.

Personal life
Khan was born in Chaman, Balochistan.
Khan had a tough childhood growing up in Chaman, a Pakistani city that borders Afghanistan and falls in the main NATO route from Pakistan to Afghanistan. 
Growing up Kaleemullah saw all aspects of life closely – to growing up playing football in the empty barren grounds with no amenities.
Kaleemullah struggled hard and traveled for two days sitting on the floor of an unreserved compartment in a train and reached for his first selection. His struggle and life is now a subject of an upcoming documentary film.
Khan is now the first Pakistani footballer to sign for an international football management agency.

Career

A product of KRL's youth system, he made his first-team breakthrough in the 2009 season; he played almost every game as the club won the league and cup double and qualified for the President's Cup. Khan scored 35 goals in all competitions in the 2012 season as KRL won a historic double; the league title, cup and qualified for the President's Cup reaching the final in 2013, scoring 5 goals in the competition. Khan won his fourth league title with KRL in 2013 season and went on to sign for Dordoi in 2014, where he played a major role in helping the team win a treble; the league title, league cup and super cup, scoring 18 goals and receiving the award for the league's highest top goalscorer, and was also named as the Best Player of Kyrgyzstan League. On 18 June 2015 it was announced that Kaleemullah had signed with the Sacramento Republic of the United Soccer League on a four-month contract, the third tier of the United States soccer league system.

Khan earned a call-up to the Pakistan national team in 2011. At the 2014 AFC Challenge Cup qualification he scored his first international goal against Macau as Pakistan won the match 2–0. In 2014, Khan was named captain of the national team.

Khan Research Laboratories

Early years

Khan is a product of Khan Research Laboratories youth academy, starting his football career in the 2009 season. He made his debut on 27 July 2009 in a 3–0 win against Air Force, scoring his first goal in the 69th minute. He finished 2009 season with 4 goals in all competitions. During the 2010 season, Khan was soon promoted to the first team by KRL manager Sajjad Mahmood. Khan took his chance and was an important player in KRL's Challenge Cup-winning squad of the 2010 season, scoring the second goal of the 4–0 win against Pakistan Navy in the cup final. Khan also made his debut AFC President's Cup on 10 May 2010 in a 2–1 win against Naga Corp from Cambodia, scoring both the goals in the continental club competition.

Khan won the Pakistan Premier League with Khan Research Laboratories in 2011 as KRL set a Pakistan Premier League record scoring the most points in a season in the Pakistan Premier League with 77 points. Khan also won the Challenge Cup with KRL (1–0) against rivals K-Electric in 2011.

2012–13 season
During 2012 season, he became involved in the first-team under then manager Tariq Lutfi who replaced manager Sajjad Mahmood the previous season; Khan established himself as a key player – playing almost in every match and scored 31 times to make him the league's all-time record top goal scorer. The club clinched a historic double; winning the league title, the domestic cup and qualified for the AFC President's Cup for the following season – finishing runners-up in the competition losing (1–0) to Turkmenistan's Balkan. Khan finished as the second top goal scorer of the continental cup with 7 goals behind Mirlan Murzaev, scoring 5 goals in an 8–0 group stage win against Yeedzin following with goals in 1–0 victory over Dordoi Bishkek from Kyrgyzstan and a 2–0 win against Hilal Al-Quds from Palestine in the final group stage.

Khan was awarded the player of the year award by Pakistan Football Federation and was declared the best player in the Pakistan Premier League for his performances domestically in the league and internationally at AFC President's Cup in 2013. In 2013 season, Khan won his fourth and last league title with the Rawalpindi side.

Dordoi Bishkek

2014 season

Kaleemullah signed for FC Dordoi Bishkek in 2014, who was soon joined by his former club and Pakistan national team players Muhammad Adil and Saddam Hussain, by former Pakistan coach Zaviša Milosavljević, after his performances in AFC President's Cup 2013 on an initial five-month contract, wearing the Number 9 shirt. After impressing during this five-month stint, Khan extended his contract by signing a new two-year contract with Dordoi in July 2014.

He played a major role in helping the team win a treble; the league title, league cup and super cup, finishing as top goal scorer, scoring 18 goals in 17 appearances in the league with 3 goals out of 3 appearances in the domestic league cup. Khan's remarkable form and greater goals to appearance ratio for Dordoi Bishkek in the Shoro Top League as well as Kyrgyzstan Cup and Kyrgyzstan Super Cup in 2014 edition earned him the best player award in the league by the Football Federation of the Kyrgyz Republic. In total, Kaleemullah finished with 21 goals in 21 matches in the 2014 season for his new club in all competitions.

2015 season
Khan made his AFC Cup debut on 9 February 2015 in a 1–0 defeat against Turkmenistan side Ahal in the preliminary round. In an interview with Express Tribune, Khan revealed that he has received letters from Þróttur Reykjavík from Iceland and Chongqing Lifan from China stating that 'they want him to train with the teams for at least a week'. In May, Khan went on trial with United Soccer League side Sacramento Republic for their 2015 season campaign.

Sacramento Republic
On 18 June 2015 it was announced that Kaleemullah had signed with the Sacramento Republic of the USL, the third tier of the United States soccer league system  on a four-month contract. At that time, it was believed that he was the first Pakistani-born player to sign a contract with a professional soccer club in the United States. About signing Kaleemullah, Republic FC Technical Director Graham Smith said, "The signing of Kaleemullah demonstrates the continued mission of Republic FC to bring the best players from around the world to our Capital City...His scoring prowess is well documented..."

He made his debut for the club on 20 June 2015, two days after signing, entering the match as a 66th-minute substitute for captain Justin Braun. The Republic won that match 2–1. During the match, he made several runs and showed his skill on the ball and eye for passing. He later described the match as a "dream debut."

Tulsa Roughnecks
On 16 December 2015, Tulsa Roughnecks FC announced the signing of Kaleemullah for the 2016 USL season. In an interview after the move, Kaleemullah said he "couldn't settle in California [with Sacramento]" but that he hoped his transfer would reignite hopes of a "dream move" to the MLS. On May 1, 2016, Khan scored his first goal for his club and first goal on American soil. By doing so, he became the first Pakistani football player to play in US and score there. “I finally scored a goal and this was important for me,” Kaleemullah told The Express Tribune. “I played as striker for the first time for Roughnecks and scored. Earlier, I was playing as a winger. So this has given me the confidence that I am good enough. I just want to thank everyone who supported me. My coach was very supportive; he took a chance by letting me play as a striker and I delivered a good performance,” said Kaleemullah. “He was happy for me that I started scoring. He said that this will benefit the team. He also told me that winning or losing is a part of the game and I just need to continue my game.”

On 22 December 2016, the Dawn Newspaper in an interview with Kaleemullah reported that he has joined K-Electric on a loan deal from Tulsa Roughnecks until March 2017.

İzmirspor
On 28 July 2018 Khan signed a contract with Turkish Club Izmirspor. His signing ceremony was attended by club's President Mustafa Gürkan. However, in August 2018, Khan parted ways with izmirspor because he didn't get international clearance certificate.

Igdirspor
Khan went on to the sign a contract with a club Igdirspor which played in the same Turkish Regional Amateur League as Izmirspor did. On September 23, 2018, Khan made his debut for the club in a 4–0 win. Khan scored a goal and provided an assist in that match. On October 15, Khan scored in 68th minute against Cayelispor, it marked as Khan's 100th club career goal, making Khan the only Pakistani footballer to achieve this feat.

Al-Najaf
On 8 March 2019, Khan signed a four-month contract with Iraqi Premier League club Al-Najaf FC for Rs. 5 million. On 4 May, Khan scored his first goal for his club in a 3–2 win over Al-Talaba SC.

Zakho 
On, 24 August 2019, Kaleemullah Khan posted two photos regarding his new club but he didn't disclose his new club's name. Later on, In September 2019, it was announced that Kaleemullah signed to Zakho.

International career
Khan represented Pakistan at various youth levels, starting with the under-23s in 2010. He was called up to the under-23 team for the 2010 Asian Games making his debut in a 6–0 group stage defeat against Thailand. He earned seven caps for the under-23s and scored one goal, the first in a 2–0 thrashing of arch-rivals India. Whilst with the under-23 team, Kaleemullah also represented Pakistan in the Asian Games and South Asian Games.
 
The following year, Khan's regular appearances for KRL's first team caused Pakistan national team manager Zaviša Milosavljević to publicly consider him for a call-up, Khan was named in the squad for a friendly against Palestine. With less opportunity to try out new players, and with the national team facing crucial qualifiers for the 2012 AFC Challenge Cup, Milosavljević felt that Khan was needed at the national level.
He was called in the senior squad for its next get-together, a training session in Lahore in March. Khan earned his first senior cap for Pakistan in a 0–0 draw against Palestine on 4 March 2011 prior to the qualifiers. He made his debut in this game as a substitute at the Punjab Stadium, his home stadium. He was named in the squad for the 2012 AFC Challenge Cup qualification matches against India, Turkmenistan and Chinese Taipei later the same month.

2014 AFC Challenge Cup qualifiers
At the 2014 AFC Challenge Cup qualification he scored his first international goal against Macau as Pakistan won the match 2–0 on 21 March 2013.

2018 World Cup qualifiers
Kaleemullah was also called up for the qualifiers for the 2018 World Cup against Yemen and played in legs of the matches which were played at neutral venues in March 2015, due to security concerns in their respective countries. Pakistan could not beat the strong Yemen national team and lost 3–1 away in Qatar, and drew 0–0 at the home leg in Bahrain. Pakistan ended up getting knocked out of the World Cup Qualifiers on an aggregate score of 3–1.

2018 Asian Games and SAFF Cup
Khan had a dispute with PFF authorities as the former spoke out on the federation's incompetence which ultimately led him not to be selected for both events. PFF banned the Pakistani players to speak about this matter on any platform. In response Khan, the experienced star striker questioned how PFF could implement such an order considering none of the players are centrally contracted to them. To further complicate matters, PFF's Sardar Naveed Haider Khan accused the striker of signing a contract with Turkish fifth-tier side Izmirspor ‘for the money’ and neglecting national duty. However Khan disagreed by saying “My name was specifically omitted from the list by PFF president because of the statements I’d given about the working of the PFF and it’s very petty-minded of them to do that really.”

Style of play
Khan's role can be described as an attacking all-rounder, a player able to play in a variety of forward positions. As he came through the youth system, he was seen primarily as a midfielder, but since breaking into the first-team he has been used in more forward roles.  Both Dordoi Bishkek and the Pakistan national team usually play a 4-2-3-1 formation, and Khan is most often part of the three attacking midfield behind the central striker. He can play in any of the attacking midfield roles but usually plays in the centre for Dordoi Bishkek and on the right or left for Pakistan. He has been used as an out-and-out striker on occasion.

Khan has been praised for his maturity, pace, technique, awareness and positioning. He has been compared with Lionel Messi due to his goal scoring record by the local media in Pakistan.

Career statistics

Club

1.Includes statistics from AFC President's Cup and AFC Cup.
2.Includes statistics from NBP President Cup, KPT-PFF Cup, Kyrgyzstan Super Cup, Ala-Too Cup, and Legend Cup.

International

International goals

U-23
Scores and results table list Pakistan's goal tally first.

Senior
Scores and results table list Pakistan's goal tally first.

Honours

Club
Khan Research Laboratories
 Pakistan Premier League: 2009, 2011, 2012, 2013; Runner-up: 2010
 Challenge Cup: 2009,  2010, 2011, 2012
 PFF Fair Play Trophy: 2013
 KPT–PFF Cup Third Place: 2010
 AFC President's Cup Runner-up: 2013

Dordoi Bishkek
Shoro Top League: 2014
Kyrgyzstan Cup: 2014
Kyrgyzstan Super Cup: 2014
Ala–Too Cup: 2015

K-Electric

 NBP President's Cup Third Place: 2017

Country
Philippine Peace Cup: Third Place: 2013

Individual

 Pakistan Premier League Top Goalscorer: 2012 (35 goals)
 Pakistan Premier League Best Player: 2013
 PFF Player of the Year: 2013
 Kyrgyzstan League Top Goalscorer: 2014 (18 goals)
 Kyrgyzstan Football League Best Player: 2014
 First Pakistani football player to be a top scorer for any foreign league outside Pakistan.
 First Pakistan home grown player to play Professional Football in America.
 First Pakistani to score 100 club career goals (42 outside of Pakistan).

Records
 Record for most Pakistan Premier League goals in a 30-game season: 31 goals
 Record for most hat-tricks scored in the Pakistan Premier League in one season: 7 (2012)
 Record for most goals scored by a Pakistani footballer in Asian competitions (club football): 9 goals
 Dordoi Bishkek Record Goalscorer: 18 goals (5th in Ranking)

References

External links

 
 
 Pakistan national team profile
 
 
 

1992 births
Living people
People from Killa Abdullah District
Pakistani footballers
Pakistani expatriate footballers
Pakistani expatriate sportspeople in the United States
Association football forwards
Association football midfielders
Pakistan international footballers
Khan Research Laboratories F.C. players
Expatriate footballers in Kyrgyzstan
Expatriate soccer players in the United States
FC Dordoi Bishkek players
Sacramento Republic FC players
FC Tulsa players
Pashtun people
Pakistani expatriate sportspeople in Kyrgyzstan
USL Championship players
Footballers at the 2010 Asian Games
Footballers at the 2014 Asian Games
Najaf FC players
Expatriate footballers in Iraq
Pakistani expatriate sportspeople in Iraq
Asian Games competitors for Pakistan
Kyrgyz Premier League players